The Xanthobacteraceae are a family of bacteria.  Among others, they include Azorhizobium, a genus of rhizobia.

Xanthobacteraceae is a diverse group of Gram-negative, rod-shaped, sometimes twisted chemoorganotrophic or facultative chemolithoautotrophic bacteria which might be motile or non-motile depending on the bacteria. Cells are 0.4–1.0 × 0.8–6 µm. However, if cells are grown in the presence of alcohol as a sole carbon source the cells can be up to 10 µm long. None of the bacteria form spores and colonies are opaque and slimy. As the bacteria contains zeaxanthin dirhamnoside the colony looks slightly yellow. In 1978, Wiegel et al established the genus Xanthobacter based on the numerical taxonomic comparisons of microorganism that was included at that time to the genus Corynebacterium. In 2005, based on comparison of 16S rRNA of the members of Alphaproteobacteria, Lee et al. proposed the family Xanthobacteraceae with five genera including Xanthobacter, Azorhizobium, Ancylobacter, Labrys, and Starkeya.

Phenotypic properties 
The family Xanthobacteraceae is quite diverse. Some cells are polymorphic. It contains a Gram-negative type cell wall and major respiratory quinone is consist of ubiquinone Q-10. Cells contain refractile (phosphate) and lipid bodies and it is evenly distributed in the cells. As cells contain polyphosphate granules, sometimes Gram reaction gives false positive results. Most chemolithoautotrophic strains need H2, O2 and CO2 in mineral media. Chemoorganoheterotrophic strains use methanol, ethanol, n-propanol, n-butanol, and different organic acid as carbon source. Some genera show the ability to fix N2 under decreased O2 pressure.

Genotype of Xanthobacteraceae 
On average the chromosomes are 4.77–5.37 Mbp in length. In Azorhizobium caulinodans, Starkeya novella, and X. autotrophicus, there are 4417–4847 predicted genes presents in the genome. A 316-kb plasmid containing 308 genes present in X. autotrophicus Py2 strains.

Ecology 
Members of the genus can be found in freshwater, wet soil that contains decaying organic materials and in the sediments. Rice paddies, soils environments, freshwater habitats such as ponds, creeks and lakes contain Ancylobacter aquaticus. Study showed that there is a relationship between the watershed urbanization and the alteration of bacterial community composition. Xanthobacteraceae consistently showed decreased abundance on increasing watershed urbanization.

Phages 
There are three known phages that can infect Xanthobacter autotrophicus strain GZ29.  There are two lytic phages named CA1 and CA2. Both have head of 61-68 nm in diameter. CA1 has a 98-100 nm tails while the length of tail for CA2 is 166-175 nm. The third phage called CA3 is lysogenic in nature and contain head of 37-43 nm and a tail of 43-50 nm in length. CA3 also contains a small DNA molecule of 3.3 kDa.

In vitro growth condition and maintenance 
Most of the strains can grow chemolithoautotrophically in the mineral media in the presence of H2, O2 and CO2. Other strains can grow chemoorganoheterotrophically on methanol, ethanol, propanol, n-butanol and organic acids. Temperature for optimal growth varies from 25–42 °C. Generally, they can grow at pH 6.5-8 with optimum growth at pH 7.5. Some strains decrease the pH of the medium during growth. Therefore, addition of buffer is recommended to maintain the optimal growth. Cultures can be maintained for 10 months at 2-5 °C in liquid medium and for up to 15 months in sealed agar slants. At -20 °C, the culture can be stored for 3 years in the presence of 60% (v/v) glycerol. Lyophilization is recommended for long term storage.

Pathogenicity and antibiotic sensitivity 
There is no known pathogenic strain found in the Xanthobacteraceae.  Some species of genus Azorhizobium are associated with plant such as Sesbania and some other leguminous plants that live in symbiosis. Some species of Xanthobacteraceae are sensitive to penicillin, novobiocin and polymyxin B. X. autotrophicus and X. flavus  are resistant to erythromycin and bacitracin.

Application 
Xanthobacteraceae species such as X. viscosus and X. aminoxidans are found in the activated sludge of water treatment plant indicating that they may play an important role in the degradation of organic compound in the pollutant environment. Recent study reveals that Xanthobacter species have some interesting biotechnological applications. Industrial activity releases some toxic compound such as polycyclic aromatic compounds (PAHs). Some bacteria in this family can degrade the toxic compound into CO2 and water. Toxic aromatic hydrocarbon such as naphthalene can be used as the sole carbon source for newly isolated Xanthobacteraceae strain Starkeya sp. strain N1B for bacterial cellulose production. This bacterial produce cellulosic biofilm using toxic compound such as naphthalene Christal. Therefore, proper knowledge about the family Xanthobacteraceae might be very useful in microbial biotechnological and environmental science.

Phylogeny
The currently accepted taxonomy is based on the List of Prokaryotic names with Standing in Nomenclature (LPSN). The phylogeny is based on whole-genome analysis.

References 

Hyphomicrobiales